Pioneer Village is located inside of the Lagoon Amusement Park in Farmington, Utah. Meant to be a "living museum," Pioneer Village includes artifacts and mementos housed in over two dozen structures, intended to make the history of Utah come alive. It was founded in 1938 near Salt Lake City by Horace and Ethel Sorensen. In April 1975, Lagoon bought the collection from the Sons of Utah Pioneers, and it opened at the amusement park in 1976.

Mormon Furniture Exhibit (Historic Rock Building)

The Mormon furniture exhibit contains furniture on loan from the Historical Department of the Church of Jesus Christ of Latter-day Saints. Most of the furniture pieces are made of pine, since hardwoods were scarce in the time of the pioneers. However, special coats of paint were used to give the pine furniture the appearance of oak, cherry, mahogany, birds eye, maple, walnut, and other hard woods. Most of the furniture was based on patterns from the East such as Empire, Federal, and Gothic Revival. However, Utah furniture was generally simpler and heavier than the styles it imitated. Some of the pieces in the exhibit include:
 The octagon top table: Carved with elaborate flowers and foliage and made out of pine, this table was made by William Bell in 1860. William Bell was an expert cabinet maker from London, England.
 The Double Lounge (or Mormon Couch): This couch was made in Utah in 1860. It could be pulled out to form a double bed. Pieces similar to this one were used by passengers on sailing ships.
 The Rocking Chair: Also carved in 1860 and made out of pine, this rocking chair was built to be large and sturdy, and closely resembles the "Boston Rocker."

Print Shop

The presses in the Pioneer Village Print shop are from Intermountain Stamp, Patterson’s Print, Ogden Standard Examiner, and the Salt Lake Stamp Company. Since communication was limited in those days, newspapers were a popular commodity and were printed in many communities throughout the state.

Charles T. Baxter Shoe Shop and Repair

This building contains the repair tools and leather working machines of Charles T. Baxter, a cobbler in American Fork, Utah around the start of the 20th century. Up until 1900, the primary mode of transportation in the Western states was walking. For a nation of walkers, the cobbler was vital.

Rockport Coop

This structure was built in 1885 and was the official Coop store of Rockport in Summit County, Utah. It was organized by farmers from the Wanship area and functioned all the way up until the 1930s. This store has a false front, which was typical of the period.

Village China Shop

This china shop contains pieces made from 1830 to 1910. Many of the pieces were carried across the plains by pioneers who knew that there would only be enough room in their covered wagons for a few of their most precious possessions.

Pioneer Stove & Hardware Museum

The Hardware Museum is the home of the Sovereign Jewel. The Sovereign Jewel is a stove that is an excellent example of how early Americans would create works of art out of ordinary household items. The bronze dome of the Sovereign Jewel is covered in gems and its doors are illuminated mica. The drapery is carved from nickel. Many years of research have gone into studying the history of the Sovereign Jewel, and as far as it can be determined, it is unique. It originally sold for $36.00, but its replacement value today would be $12,500.

Post Office

The Post office was built in Charleston, Wasatch County, Utah in 1905 and operated until 1955. Today it contains the original postmaster's desk and dozens of postal boxes, each with their own combination lock. Like most rural towns in Utah, Charleston did not have mail delivery until recently, so residents would have to come to the post office to pick up their letters.

Bakery

The bakery in Pioneer Village sells many baked goods and is the home of the first soda fountain in Utah. The soda fountain came across the plains by wagon which was no easy feat, since the fountain consists primarily of a large marble slab. It was housed in the store of William S. Godbe, which was built in 1855. Customers at the store could choose between strawberry, raspberry, sarsaparilla, and cream soda. In those days, a glass of soda cost 10 cents.

David E. Sperry's Model Train Museum

The David E. Sperry Model Train Museum contains dozens of model trains, most of which are from the collection of David E. Sperry. Sperry's fascination with trains began in 1928 when he saw an electric train in a friend’s sandbox. From 1930 to 1934 he went through many catalogs and store displays in an effort to increase his collection. In 1935 he was hired by ZCMI as a model train salesman. Over the next sixteen years, he helped customers build their own train layouts both in the store and in their homes. He later joined the local and national train collectors clubs where he received the title, "The Repairman’s Repair Man."

The train museum is also home to "The Lagoon Miniature Railroad." Built in 1925 in Ogden, Utah, the engine was powered by coal and steam. Originally the train ran two routes: one around the northeast of the Carousel and then north of the White Roller Coaster, and one through the midway and the picnic boweries. For many years the train was on display next to the Lagoon Lake and in 1974 it was rebuilt and ran again until 1986 when it was finally retired.

Just outside the museum is the Union Pacific Semaphore. Built in 1920 in Swissvale, Pennsylvania, this style B lower quadrant semaphore was originally located in Nephi, Utah along the Union Pacific Railroad line. It was used to signal trains to either slow down and pick up orders, or proceed to the next signal. It is said that the design of traffic stoplights were adopted from this type of device.

Village Blacksmith

This blacksmith shop was built in 1858 and was used to meet the needs of Johnston’s Army stationed at Camp Floyd. The original tools are still on display in the building.

Carriage Hall
Most people are aware of the covered wagons used by early pioneers who settled the territory. But not everyone is aware of the wide variety of horse-drawn vehicles used in those times. This museum contains some of the major styles of carriages used in that era. Some of them include the following:
 The White Top: With the seats in place, the White Top could be used for family transportation. With the seats removed, it could be used for light work. The White Top could be found in farms across America.
 The Buckboard: The Buckboard was a light wagon and was often used by Peddlers. The wagon was equipped with drawers, hangers, racks and compartments, all for the storage and display of the peddler's goods.
 The Harney Coach: The Harney Coach was one of the most expensive coaches in the U.S. and only one of it was ever made. It was originally bought in Europe and was shipped to New Orleans where it was floated on a barge to Tippets, Missouri. There it was picked up by Captain Harney (the second in command of Johnston’s Army) who drove the coach across the plains to Fort Bridger, Wyoming where Harney presented it to the wife of Judge W.A. Carter, the First Lady of the Territory. The style of the Harney Coach is called "the Berlin," which has a large coach body set on a double perch.
 The Victoria Carriage: The Victoria Carriage started to be popular in 1869 when Edward the VII (the Prince of Wales) presented one to his mother, Queen Victoria.
 The Rockaway: The Rockaway was especially popular among the upper and middle classes. In 1900, there were 3,166 Rockaways built in the U.S.
 The Brougham: The Brougham was designed by Lord Brougham in England in 1837. If a high class gentleman were to only have one carriage, the Brougham would usually be it. The Brougham could seat one coachman and one passenger.
 The Light delivery wagon Studebaker: The Light Delivery Wagon was part of the delivery and merchandising scene in America for nearly 100 years. Oil wagons were used to carry kerosene. Linen wagons were used to carry laundry. Ice wagons would carry about 700 pounds of ice that was harvested in the winter from frozen ponds. Deseret News delivery wagons would carry newspapers. Rural Free Delivery wagons would carry letters, booklets, and magazines.
 Peter Schuttler Wagon: This wagon weighed 1600 pounds and could be used to haul three tons.
 The Mormon Handcart: The Mormon Handcart was usually made according to the specifications which Brigham Young set forth. Its wheels were four feet in diameter with 10 spokes. Its bed was 36" by 48" and was 9" deep. This design was used by the pioneers from 1856 to 1860. Nearly 3,000 people made their way west with this type of vehicle. These carts typically weighed from 100 to 160 pounds and could only carry 500 to 600 pounds (or the possessions of 6 or 7 people). The handcart pioneers traveled over 1,300 miles, and the journey usually took four to five months.
 The Surrey Sleigh: The Surrey Sleigh was large and roomy. It had a curved dash and was mounted with a nickel-plated snow screen.

Barber Shop
The Pioneer Village Barber Shop contains a large collection of shaving mugs and other barber shop equipment from the 1890s. In addition to offering a shave and a hair cut, the barber shop also provided bathing facilities. Because of this, it contains a tin tub and a pot-bellied stove where water was heated.

Gun Collection
The Pioneer Village Gun Exhibit Building is modeled after the Fort Douglas Ordnance Building built in 1860. The weapons displayed in the building range from guns used in medieval times to weapons used today. Many of the guns on display were used in the Revolutionary and Civil Wars, and several were used by gunfighters in the Old West.

The Gun Exhibit Building also contains a safe that belonged to Porter Rockwell.

Bigler Cabin
The Bigler Cabin was built by Jacob G. Bigler, a Pioneer Weaver who was an early settler in the Nephi area. Mr. Bigler lived and worked in this house, and wove cloth that he traded with other settlers.

Gingerbread House
The Pioneer Village Gingerbread house was built by Alma Gibbons in 1904. Alma Gibbons cut the trees, hauled them to his saw mill, and then built this home with his own hands. Supposedly the building is haunted (much like the rest of the village) and anyone in it alone at six in the evening is invited to dinner.

Little Rock Chapel
The Little Rock Chapel was constructed in 1863 and originally served as a fort. It then became a courthouse with a jail attached. After that it became a schoolhouse, and in 1869 it was designated by Brigham Young as an LDS church. Today the building contains the original pews, pot-bellied stove and lectern.

Erastus Bingham Cabin
This log cabin was built by Erastus Bingham in North Ogden in 1853. Bingham was a farmer and a father of ten children. Two of those children discovered the Bingham Copper mines, which were named after them.

Rockport School House
The Rockport School House was constructed in 1870 out of "squared-off" pine logs. In the winter, the school children they would have to huddle around the pot-bellied stoves to keep warm since it was impossible to adequately heat the entire cabin. The building also served as an LDS chapel until a few years later when the LDS settlers could afford to construct a church.

Wanship Cabin
The Wanship cabin was the first two-story home built in Summit County. It contains a great deal of pioneer era furniture including a pine rocking chair, a high post bed, and a Mormon Couch.

Past attractions of Pioneer Village
The following rides and attractions no longer exist in Pioneer Village:
 Ute Indian Museum – Located north of the Blacksmith.
 General Store – Located in what is now Arby's.
 Pony Express Museum
 Ox-Drawn Wagon Rides
 Pioneer Village Railroad – Circled the entire village. The station is now the Model Railroad Museum.
 Lagoon Miniature Railroad – Smaller train which circled the northern portion of the village. The locomotive and tender are now on display in the Model Railroad Museum.

See also
 This Is the Place Heritage Park

Sources
 Lagoon Corp.

External links
 Official Lagoon Website
 Lagoon History Project: Pioneer Village An unofficial history of Lagoon.

1938 establishments in Utah
Carriage museums in the United States
Lagoon (amusement park)
Landmarks in Utah
Museums established in 1938
Museums in Davis County, Utah
Open-air museums in Utah
Pre-statehood history of Utah
Transportation museums in Utah
Western false front architecture
American West museums